Professor Deborah Jane "Debbie" Terry  is an Australian academic administrator and psychology scholar. She is currently the Vice-Chancellor and President of The University of Queensland. Professor Terry is also currently the Chair of Universities Australia, the peak body representing Australia's higher education sector.

Early life and education 
Terry was born in Western Australia but completed her secondary education at Canberra Girls Grammar School. She then studied at the Australian National University, graduating with a BA and then a PhD in 1989.

Career 
Terry moved to Brisbane where she was employed in the School of Psychology at The University of Queensland in 1990. In 2000 she was promoted to head of school and 2008 saw her become deputy vice-chancellor of the university.

In February 2014, Terry was appointed Vice-Chancellor and President of Curtin University. In August 2020, she returned to The University of Queensland and became the Vice-Chancellor and President.

In addition to her university role, Terry is a past president of the Society for Australasian Social Psychology. She has also been on the editorial board of the British Journal of Psychology and the European Journal of Social Psychology. In May 2019 Terry began a two-year term as Chair of Universities Australia, having been a member of its board since 2015. In March 2021 she addressed the National Press Club.

Awards and recognition 
Terry was appointed Fellow of the Academy of the Social Sciences in Australia in 2003. She was awarded the Officer of the Order of Australia (AO) in the 2015 Queen's Birthday Honours for " distinguished service to education in the tertiary sector through senior administrative roles, as an academic and researcher in the field of psychology, and as a mentor". She is also a Fellow of the Australian Psychology Society.

Selected publications

References 

Living people
Year of birth missing (living people)
Officers of the Order of Australia
Australian National University alumni
Academic staff of the University of Queensland
Academic staff of Curtin University
Fellows of the Academy of the Social Sciences in Australia